Glodi Ngonda Muzinga (born 31 December 1994) is a Congolese professional footballer who plays as a right-back for Latvian Higher League club Riga FC and the DR Congo national team.

Club career
Muzinga has played club football for AS Vita Club and Dijon.

On 20 July 2021, he moved to Riga FC in Latvia.

International career
Muzinga made his international debut for DR Congo in 2017.

References

1994 births
Living people
Democratic Republic of the Congo footballers
Democratic Republic of the Congo international footballers
Association football fullbacks
AS Vita Club players
Dijon FCO players
Riga FC players
Ligue 1 players
Latvian Higher League players
2019 Africa Cup of Nations players
Democratic Republic of the Congo expatriate footballers
Democratic Republic of the Congo expatriate sportspeople in France
Expatriate footballers in France
Democratic Republic of the Congo expatriate sportspeople in Latvia
Expatriate footballers in Latvia